Passi is a French hip hop artist.

Passi may also refer to:

People
 Passi (surname), surname origin, plus people with the name

Places
Passi, Iloilo, city in the Philippines
Passi, Estonia, village in Alatskivi Parish, Tartu County, Estonia

See also
 Pasi (disambiguation)
 Passy (disambiguation)